Guy Fischer (born 12 January 1944 in Décines-Charpieu – died 1 November 2014,) was a member of the Senate of France, representing the Rhône department.  He was a member of the French Communist Party and of the Communist, Republican, and Citizen Group.

References

Page on the Senate website

1944 births
2014 deaths
People from Décines-Charpieu
French Communist Party politicians
French Senators of the Fifth Republic
Senators of Rhône (department)